Cindy Kelly Jorgenson (née Cindy Susan Kelly; born April 6, 1953) is a senior United States district judge of the United States District Court for the District of Arizona.

Early life and education
Born in Fort Ord, California, Jorgenson received a Bachelor of Science degree from the University of Arizona in 1974 and a Juris Doctor from the University of Arizona College of Law in 1977.

Legal career
Following law school graduation, Jorgenson was a deputy county attorney in the Pima County, Arizona, County Attorney's Office from 1977 to 1986. She was then an Assistant United States Attorney of the United States Attorney's Office for the District of Arizona from 1986 to 1996. She was a judge on the Pima County Superior Court from 1996 to 2002.

Federal judicial career
On September 10, 2001, Jorgenson was nominated by President George W. Bush to a new seat on the United States District Court for the District of Arizona created by 113 Stat. 1501. She was confirmed by the United States Senate on February 26, 2002, and received her commission on March 6, 2002. She assumed senior status on April 6, 2018.

References

 

1953 births
Living people
20th-century American judges
21st-century American judges
Arizona state court judges
Assistant United States Attorneys
James E. Rogers College of Law alumni
Judges of the United States District Court for the District of Arizona
United States district court judges appointed by George W. Bush
University of Arizona alumni
20th-century American women judges
21st-century American women judges